Kirawsk or Kirovsk is an urban settlement in Mogilev Region, Belarus, and the administrative center of Kirawsk District. As of 2009, its population was 8,756.

References

Populated places in Mogilev Region
Kirawsk District
Bobruysky Uyezd
Towns in Belarus